Muckross Park College is a non fee paying Catholic secondary school for girls, located in Donnybrook, Dublin, Ireland. Founded in 1900, the curriculum is traditional, with a broad general programme of subjects and a compulsory Transition year programme. Muckross is one of a number of Dominican schools in Ireland. It has a student body of 708.

The school is active in many sports and sports tournaments, including in hockey, tennis, and basketball. Some former students have gone on to play for Ireland at the international level. Academically, the school has achieved high results and ranked highly in The Irish Times list of feeder schools for 3rd level education in Ireland.

History
The school was founded in 1900 as St. Mary's University College, initially a third-level college for women studying for degrees awarded by the Royal University of Ireland.

Junior and senior years
First, second and third years undertake the Junior Cycle curriculum in preparation for the Junior Certificate Examination.

Transition year (TY) consists of organising work placements several times throughout the year, as well as much more such as a school trip abroad. Every week, TY students undertake dance and drama classes at the nearby Independent Theatre Workshop studios. Other class modules include cooking, horticulture, yearbook, film making, and fitness.

Fifth year is spent preparing students for the Leaving Certificate Examinations. However, students also take part in a ski trip as well as a musical with Gonzaga College.

In Sixth Year, students do their Leaving Certificate Examinations. They may also take part in a pre-debs party, a mock party, and graduation mass.

Clubs and events
There are many clubs and activities in the school, including a book club. There is also a school choir, and a glee club has been introduced in the last few years.

Events during the school year include the opening of the school year mass which occurs in Donnybrook church. Other events include a Halloween dress-up day, and a sports day towards the end of the year. Every year gets a one- or two-day retreat as well as day trips (Ferrycarrig, museums and galleries, the Gaisce hike and Carlingford for T.Y, Newgrange etc.)

In previous years, transition year students at Muckross collaborated with transition year students of St. Michaels College in a charity fashion show. The show had different themes each year, and was a fundraiser for that year's chosen charity. The fashion show is no longer in action.

Sports
Muckross Park fields hockey teams at Minor, Junior and Senior levels, and has won many Leinster League titles. The Senior 1 team has also claimed the Senior Cup on several occasions. The senior basketball team, "The Cadettes", are also high achievers on the competitive circuit. Other sports include cricket, handball, tennis, swimming, horse-riding and athletics.

Past Pupils' Union
The Past Pupils' Union (PPU) began in 1912, twelve years after the school was founded. This makes it the oldest all-girls Past Pupils Union in Ireland. The Muckross Adult Choir consists of past pupils, staff members and parents of current and past Muckross pupils.

The Union also fundraises for its Benevolent Fund, which is used to grant financial assistance to those in need. The Muckross Park Past Pupils' Union Benevolent Fund was set-up during the tenure of the 1977/79 committee with the primary objective of helping past pupils who find themselves in financial difficulty. Over the years, the Fund has been used to support past pupils who have been impacted by serious illness, disability, bereavement, and unemployment. The Fund has also supported the education of students in need and other charitable causes deemed appropriate at the discretion of the committee, such as a Dominican early-learning programme in South Africa and a Dominican third-level project in Argentina. The fund is financed by way of an annual raffle and also through private donations.

Notable alumnae
 Nuala Carey, weather presenter on RTÉ 1 and Network 2
 Emma Donoghue, author of the book "Room", shortlisted for the Man-Booker prize
 Beatrice Doran, former chief librarian at the Royal College of Surgeons in Ireland
 Dara Fitzpatrick, Irish Coastguard helicopter pilot
 Mary Rose Gearty, judge of the Irish High Court
 Gemma O'Doherty, Far right activist and former Irish journalist 
 Anna O'Flanagan, Irish international hockey player
 Síofra O'Leary, Judge at the European Court of Human Rights
 Máire Ní Chinnéide, Irish Language Activist, playwright, first president of the Camogie Association, and first female president of Oireachtas na Gaeilge

See also 

 Education in the Republic of Ireland
 List of Catholic schools in Ireland by religious order

References

External links

Muckross Park Past Pupils Union

Girls' schools in the Republic of Ireland
Secondary schools in Dublin (city)
Catholic secondary schools in the Republic of Ireland
Donnybrook, Dublin
Dominican schools
1900 establishments in Ireland
Educational institutions established in 1900